The Rustar dhow located in Dubai, United Arab Emirates is a royal boat that can accommodate 400 passengers. At  it has set the world record for the largest floating restaurant.

The Rustar Dhow has three levels, a lower level which is used as a bar or dance floor (upon request), the middle level which is a dinner hall and the upper deck, which is an open air dinner deck.

References

Theme restaurants
Ships of the United Arab Emirates
Floating restaurants
Restaurants in Dubai
2007 ships
Restaurants established in 2007